Kundian, is the 2nd largest city of  District Mianwali, tehsil Piplan in the Punjab province of Pakistan. Its population is near 50,000. This is divided into Kundian Katcha & Pacca units with total population of 150,000. Kundian Jn. railway station was built in 1896. Kundian is about 200 m above MSL. Kundian faces cold winds from Tajikistan and Afghanistan region being in line with river Kurram.

History 

The first settlement record of Kundian is from 1878. Old Kundian was situated, starting from Himmat Shah to Seelwan Chitta School in West of Current Kundian, Aliwali. Kundi tribes' head Muhammad Ismail Kundi came from district Laghari Chak of Jhang to Kundian. There lived Ghakkars in Kundian. Then a huge flood came, so old Kundian was demolished. According to records, Tiwana rulers arranged for Kundis to live near the Indus river bank.

This town remained famous during the British regime and was considered a railway hub in North Western State Railway (NWR). Being in line with Sakesar top hills of Salt range, Kundian became a railway Junction. The old benches of Northwestern Railway can still be seen at Kundian Railway Junction. Railway Locomotive Shed is the 3rd largest locomotive shed of Pakistan Railways. This town remained on the transport priority map during Sher Shah Suri regime. The British government set up civil Rest House to manage local administrative affairs. Kundian Junction railway station is also a railway centre for locals of Katcha areas and Billott Sharif too.

There is a big Pakistan State Oil's  oil depot in Kundian. Kundian remained a military pathway from hereby to Kundal, Darra Tang and Afghanistan.

Khanqah Sirajia is a very famous religious place in the south of Kundian.

Chashma Barrage and Chashma Hydroelectric Project are also located in Kundian. Kundian Nuclear Fuel Complex (KNFC) is also in the close vicinity.

Attractions 
The Chashma Barrage is a notable attraction of Kundian, numerous people and families go there to swim and have fun, besides Kundian has many cultural attractions such as the Big Baazar in the heart of Kundian, Kundian is divided into several districts or Mohallas, for example, Mohalla Mominpura, which is the main and the most important district of Kundian. Kalyaran Wala Mohalla, Wattonwan Wala Mohalla are other examples. Besides that, Kundian has many pizza shops, restaurants, and marts. It also has renowned parks and farms for sightseeing, however, none of these beat the tourist attraction which is the Chashma Lake.

References

External links

Kundian Junction railway station

Union councils of Mianwali District
Populated places in Mianwali District